Zarnan may refer to:
 Zarnan, Lorestan
 Zarnan, Tehran
 Zarnan, Zanjan